The Roman Catholic Metropolitan Archdiocese of Quito is the Catholic archdiocese in the capital city of Ecuador, Quito. It was established as the Diocese of Quito on 8 January 1545, before being elevated to archdiocese level on January 13, 1848 by Pope Pius IX.

Bishops
Bishops of Quito
García Díaz Arias (8 Jan 1546 – 1562)
Pedro de la Peña, O.P. (15 May 1565 – 7 Mar 1583)
Antonio Avendaño y Paz, O.F.M. (9 Mar 1588 – 7 Nov 1590)
Luis López de Solís, O.S.A. (7 Sep 1592 – 18 Jul 1605), appointed Archbishop of La Plata o Charcas, Bolivia
Salvador Ribera Avalos, O.P. (17 Aug 1605 – 1612)
Hernando de Arias y Ugarte (22 Apr 1613 – 14 Mar 1616), appointed Archbishop of Santafé en Nueva Granada, Colombia
Alfonso Santillán Fajardo, O.P. (23 Mar 1616 – 15 Oct 1620)
Francisco Sotomayor, O.F.M. (18 Dec 1623 – 5 Jun 1628), appointed Archbishop of La Plata o Charcas, Bolivia
Pedro de Oviedo Falconi, O. Cist. (10 Jul 1628 – 21 Aug 1645); Archbishop (personal title); appointed Archbishop of La Plata o Charcas, Bolivia
Agustín de Ugarte y Sarabia (1648 – 6 Dec 1650)
Alfonso de la Peña y Montenegro (18 Aug 1653 – 1687)
Sancho de Andrade de Figueroa (15 Nov 1688 – 1702)
Diego Ladrón de Guevara (15 Sep 1704 – 1710)
Luis Francisco Romero (12 Jul 1717 – 19 Nov 1725), appointed Archbishop of La Plata o Charcas, Bolivia
Juan Gómez de Neva y Frías (19 Nov 1725 – 21 Aug 1729)
Andrés Paredes Polanco y Armendáriz (18 Jun 1731 – 3 Jul 1745)
Juan Nieto Polo del Aguila (28 Nov 1746 – 12 Mar 1759)
Pedro Ponce y Carrasco (20 Dec 1762 – 28 Oct 1775)
Blas Manuel Sobrino y Minayo (16 Dec 1776 – 15 Dec 1788), appointed Bishop of Santiago de Chile
José Pérez Calama (30 Mar 1789 – 2 Dec 1792)
José Fernández Díaz de la Madrid, O.F.M. (3 December 1792 – 4 June 1794)
Miguel Alvarez Cortes (22 September 1795 – 1 February 1801)
José de Cuero y Caicedo (23 December 1801 – 10 December 1815)
Leonardo Santander y Villavicencio (2 October 1818 – 29 April 1824)
Rafael Lasso de la Vega (15 December 1828 – 16 April 1831)
Nicolás Joaquín de Arteta y Calisto (29 July 1833 – 6 September 1849)
Archbishops of Quito
Francisco Xavier de Garaycoa Llaguno (5 September 1851 – 2 December 1959)
José María Riofrío y Valdivieso (22 July 1861 – 2 April 1867)
José María de Jesús Yerovi Pintado, O.F.M. (2 April 1867 – 20 June 1867)
José Ignacio Checa y Barba (16 March 1868 – 30 March 1877)
José Ignacio Ordóñez (3 July 1882 – 14 July 1893)
Pedro Rafael González y Calixto (14 July 1893 – 27 March 1905)
Federico González Suárez (14 December 1905 – 5 December 1917)
Manuel María Pólit y Lasso (7 June 1918 – 30 October 1932)
Carlos María de la Torre (8 September 1933 – 23 June 1967); elevated to Cardinal in 1953
Pablo Muñoz Vega, S.J. (23 June 1967 – 1 June 1985); elevated to Cardinal in 1969
Antonio José González Zumárraga (1 June 1985 – 21 March 2003); elevated to Cardinal in 2001
Raúl Eduardo Vela Chiriboga (21 March 2003 – 11 September 2010); elevated to Cardinal in 2010
Fausto Trávez Trávez, O.F.M. (11 September 2010 – 5 April 2019)
Alfredo José Espinoza Mateus, S.D.B. (5 April 2019 – present)

Coadjutor bishops
José María de Jesús Yerovi Pintado, O.F.M. Obs. (1865-1867)
Pedro Rafael González y Calixto (1893)
Pablo Muñoz Vega, S.J. (1964-1967); future Cardinal
Antonio José González Zumárraga (1980-1985); future Cardinal

Auxiliary bishops
Miguel Fernández Flórez, O.F.M. Obs. (1815-1817)
José Miguel Carrión y Valdivieso (1840-1842)
José María Riofrío y Valdivieso (1853-1861), appointed Archbishop here
Ulpiano María Pérez y Quiñones (1907), appointed Bishop of Ibarra
Benigno Chiriboga, S.J. (1958-1963), appointed Bishop of Latacunga
Antonio José González Zumárraga (1969-1980), appointed Coadjutor here; future Cardinal
Juan Ignacio Larrea Holguín (1969-1980), appointed Bishop of Ibarra
Luis Alberto Luna Tobar, O.C.D. (1977-1981), appointed Archbishop of Cuenca
Emilio Lorenzo Stehle (1983-1987), appointed Prelate of Santo Domingo de los Colorados
Luis Enrique Orellana Ricaurte, S.J. (1986-1994)
Antonio Arregui Yarza (1990-1995), appointed Bishop of Ibarra
Carlos Anibal Altamirano Argüello (1994-2004), appointed Bishop of Azogues
Julio César Terán Dutari, S.J. (1995-2004), appointed Bishop of Ibarra
Segundo René Coba Galarza (2006-2014), appointed Bishop of Ecuador, Military
Vincente Danilo Echeverría Verdesoto (2006-
David Israel De la Torre Altamirano, SS.CC. (2019-

Other priests of this diocese who became bishops
Miguel Angel Aguilar Miranda, appointed Bishop of Guaranda in 1991
Skiper Bladimir Yáñez Calvachi, appointed Bishop of Guaranda in 2014

Suffragan dioceses
Diocese of Ambato
Diocese of Guaranda
Diocese of Ibarra
Diocese of Latacunga
Diocese of Riobamba
Diocese of Tulcán

References

External links
Official website 
Catholic Encyclopedia entry
Catholic Hierarchy entry

Quito
Roman Catholic dioceses in Ecuador
Roman Catholic Ecclesiastical Province of Quito
1545 establishments in the Spanish Empire
Religious organizations established in the 1540s
Roman Catholic dioceses established in the 16th century